Joshua Daniel "Josh" Scott (born 10 May 1985) is an English professional footballer who played as a striker.

Career

Early career
Scott started his career with non-League club Hayes in the 2003–04 season, before their merger with Yeading into Hayes & Yeading United. He ended the 2008–09 season as Hayes & Yeading's top goal scorer with 25 goals, helping them to secure promotion into the Conference National.

Dagenham and Redbridge
He signed for League Two club Dagenham & Redbridge on 1 July 2009, agreeing a three-year contract. Scott made his debut for Dagenham on 11 August in the first round of the League Cup away against Cardiff City, replacing Wesley Thomas as a substitute in the 55th minute. He scored with a close range shot in the 80th minute, as Dagenham lost 3–1. Scott scored four goals as Dagenham beat Morecambe 6–0 in the League Two Play–off semi finals first leg. He is also the only player to score four in one match in a play-off match.

In March 2012, Scott signed a new 2-year contract with the Daggers which will keep him at the club till the summer of 2014. He was loaned out to Blue Square Bet Premier club Ebbsfleet United for an initial month in February 2013.

On 15 January 2014, Scott had his contract cancelled by mutual consent.

Career statistics

References

External links

1985 births
Living people
English footballers
Hayes F.C. players
Hayes & Yeading United F.C. players
Dagenham & Redbridge F.C. players
Ebbsfleet United F.C. players
Aldershot Town F.C. players
English Football League players
National League (English football) players
Isthmian League players
Association football forwards